Bernardo Fontaine Talavera (born 10 June 1964) is a Chilean economist who was a member of the Chilean Constitutional Convention.

His father was director of El Mercurio.

References

External links
 BCN Profile

Living people
1964 births
21st-century Chilean politicians
Pontifical Catholic University of Chile alumni
Members of the Chilean Constitutional Convention
People from Santiago